People's Coalition may refer to:
People's Coalition (Croatia), a coalition in Croatia dominated by the Social Democratic Party of Croatia
People's Coalition (Fiji), a coalition in Fiji, dominated by the Fiji Labour Party, which contested (and won) the 1999 elections
People's Coalition (Spain), a coalition in Spain that operated in the 1980s, dominated by the People's Party
People's Coalition 5 Plus (Narodnaja Kaalicyja Piaciorka Plus), a political alliance in Belarus, formed to oppose President Alexander Lukashenko in the 2004 elections

See also
Coalition